The 2009 Shanghai International Film Festival is the 12th such festival devoted to international cinema to be held in Shanghai, China. It was held from June 13-21, 2009.

Jury
This year's jury members are:
Danny Boyle (UK, head of jury) 
Xavier Koller (Switzerland)
Jianxin Huang (China)
Komaki Kurihara (Japan)
Andy Lau (Hong Kong)
Andie MacDowell (USA)
Jung-Wan Oh (South Korea)

Awards

Golden Goblet
 Golden Goblet for Best Film
 Original, directed by Alexander Brøndsted, Antonio Tublen 
 Golden Goblet for Best Actor
 Sverrir Gudnason for Original
 Golden Goblet for Best Actress
 Simone Tang for Kærestesorger 
 Best Director
Julius Ševčík for Normal
 Best Cinematography
 Nicolas Guicheteau Hans Meier for Nulle part terre promise 
 Contribution to Cinema
Priyanka Chopra

Asian New Talent Award
 Best Director
 Ye Zhao for Zha lai nuo er
 Audience Award
 Ye Zhao for Zha lai nuo er

References

External links
Official website
2009 Shanghai International Film Festival 
 12th Shanghai International Film Festival from the Internet Movie Database

Shanghai International Film Festival
Shanghai International Film Festival
Shanghai
Shanghai
21st century in Shanghai